The University of Baltimore (UBalt, UB) is a public university in Baltimore, Maryland. It is part of the University System of Maryland. UBalt's schools and colleges provide education in business, law, public affairs, and the applied arts and sciences. The university is the location of one of Maryland's two law schools.

History

Early history 

 Founded by a group of Baltimore business professionals, UBalt originally sought to provide educational opportunities for working men and women, meaning that the first classes were held not above the ornate dragons of the current liberal arts and policy building, but in a four-story rowhouse on St. Paul St. in 1925.

In 1937, after the addition of day programs to augment the initial night courses, a full-scale junior college was added to the university's offerings. Other changes in the following decades included the construction of the Langsdale Library in 1966, according to an administrative history of the school. In the 1970s, UBalt merged with Eastern College, Mount Vernon School of Law, and Baltimore College of Commerce.

During the presidency of Thomas Granville Pullen, the university became regionally accredited in 1971 with the Middle States Association of Colleges and Schools and built the Langsdale Library. For a three-decade period that started in 1975 and would eventually end in 2007, UBalt became an "upper division academic institution,” offering only third and fourth year undergraduate and post-graduate course work. Also in 1975, ownership was assumed by the state of Maryland.

In 1988, the state merged UBalt into the new statewide university system, the University of Maryland System, which was later renamed University System of Maryland.

Lower division Initiative and later developments 
The Lower Division Initiative was a program that began in 2005 to extend the University of Baltimore's position to once again offer the first two years of the baccalaureate degree. In April 2005, the University System of Maryland's board of regents approved plans that would allow UBalt to start accepting freshmen and sophomores. Under the original plan, freshmen and sophomore were to be admitted starting in the fall of 2006.

In a unanimous vote on February 15, 2006, the Maryland Higher Education Commission approved a revised mission statement submitted by the University of Baltimore, thus enabling the university to return to four-year undergraduate status. This was the same initiative that had received approval from the board of regents in 2005; however, the plan was revised slightly, calling for freshmen to be admitted in the fall of 2007.

The university stated that the new program better reflected the current focus and was designed to prepare students in business, pre-law, technology, public affairs, and applied liberal arts. It also said that it would offer freshmen "free" tuition for their first year, a benefit made possible by an anonymous private donor. An estimate stated that 140 freshmen were expected in the incoming class of fall of 2007.

Near the time of the change, the university also changed the school colors and adopted the new slogan, "Knowledge that works".

Since beginning to accept freshmen again, UBalt has built a new, 12-story building for the university's law school along with the construction of additional residential capacity on campus. In May 2014, it was announced that Kurt L. Schmoke would become the university's eighth president, succeeding retired president Robert Bogomolny.

As of 2022, the renovation of Langsdale Library, which was renamed to Robert L. Bogomolny Library, was complete. The renovation was designed by the German architectural firm Behnisch Architekten, which had also been responsible for the design of the 2013 law school structure at Charles St. and Mount Royal Ave.

Starting in 2005, the university's MBA program has been the target of nearby institutions' criticism regarding a supposed diversion of funds, with UB's status as a traditionally white institution bringing calls for a restructuring of state funding. As of early 2022, that criticism was ongoing.

Academics
The university offers numerous undergraduate, graduate, and professional as well as several certificate and joint degree programs. It offers over 20 Bachelor of Arts and Bachelor of Science degree programs, spanning the arts and sciences, public affairs, and business.

At the master's level, UBalt offers a Master of Public Administration (MPA), a Master of Business Administration (previously offered jointly with Towson University), and 11 Master of Science degrees. The MPA program was the first in the state to be fully accredited by the National Association of Schools of Public Affairs and Administration (NASPAA); it was also ranked 68th nationally in U.S. News & World Report's 2016 edition of "Best Grad Schools.” Additionally, the university offers a Master of Fine Arts and, exclusively at the Universities at Shady Grove, a Master of Professional Studies. In addition, it offers a Master of Fine Arts and a Master of Professional Studies (exclusively at the Universities at Shady Grove) as well as several dual degree programs. The university's Masters degree in Applied Psychology, Counseling Psychology concentration, is accredited by the Masters in Psychology and Counseling Accreditation Council (MPCAC). The law school offers a Master of Laws degree.

At the doctoral level, UBalt offers a program leading to a research-based Doctor of Science in Information and Interaction Design. UBalt also offers a Doctor of Public Administration. Through its law school, UBalt offers the Juris Doctor.

Colleges and schools
The university is composed of multiple colleges and schools:
Merrick School of Business
School of Law
Yale Gordon College of Arts and Sciences
College of Public Affairs

Campus and student services

The main campus is located in Baltimore's Mt. Vernon cultural district, close to downtown and the Inner Harbor. The Lyric Opera House, Joseph Meyerhoff Symphony Hall, and the Maryland Institute College of Art (MICA) are nearby. For the most part, the main academic buildings surround the intersections of Mount Royal Avenue and North Charles Street.  Gordon Plaza is at the center of campus.

University buildings
The buildings include:
H. Mebane Turner Learning Commons
The Academic Center
The Charles Royal Building
John and Frances Angelos Law Center
Robert L. Bogomolny Library
UBalt Student Center
William H. Thumel Sr. Business Center
The Liberal Arts and Policy Building

Student housing developments
The university, the Bozzuto Group, and the Gould Property Co. entered into a public-private joint venture to develop UBalt's Bolton Yard parking lot into a mixed use development, including apartments, a UBalt student bookstore, other retail, and garage parking. The project, which is named the Fitzgerald at UB Midtown, broke ground in 2008 and was largely complete by 2011.

The Fitzgerald project was viewed at the time of its inception as a prelude to future public-private development projects—for instance more student housing. To that end, an October 2010 announcement indicated that the university was planning an 11-story student housing tower, to again be built in partnership with a private company, according to The Baltimore Sun. The student housing tower was largely complete by mid-2012.

According to a 2014 Baltimore Sun article, the university is considering building additional dormitory space on West Oliver Street, at the site of a facility currently used for postal vehicle maintenance. That development has yet to be named.

Police and Public Safety
The University of Maryland, Baltimore (UMB) and University of Baltimore (UBalt) began a public safety collaboration in the first quarter of 2022. All police officers on the UBalt campus are employed by the UMB Police Department (UMBPD). The UMBPD is a fully certified law enforcement agency through the Maryland Police and Correctional Training Commissions (MPCTC).

UBalt maintains responsibility for campus security performed by unarmed, civilian security personnel known as the UBalt Safety and Security team. Uniformed officers from UMB — sworn, armed, and professionally trained and certified — are assigned to patrol the UBalt campus. At the same time, UBalt's Safety and Security staff provides building access and control, including office lockouts, welcome desk staffing, interior/exterior patrols, and more.

Local transit

Penn Station, with connections to Amtrak and MARC service, and a Light Rail stop, are just to the north of campus. The University of Baltimore/Mt. Royal station on the Baltimore Light Rail system is on the northwest edge of campus. The State Center station on the Baltimore Metro system is just a few blocks from campus. UBalt runs shuttle bus service between its academic buildings, parking garages, and the nearby public transportation/local transit stops.

Satellite campuses
In conjunction with the University System of Maryland, UBalt offers courses and several undergraduate and graduate degree programs at the Universities at Shady Grove in Rockville, Maryland. Through a partnership with the College of Southern Maryland, UBalt offers the upper-level undergraduate coursework leading toward the bachelor's degree in business in Southern Maryland.  UBalt also offers online classes.

Student life
UBalt has numerous academic clubs, student organizations, and an active student government; as of May 2017, more than 90 were listed on the university's website. The academic clubs usually sponsor a host of programs and speakers throughout the school year. Not all clubs are academic or sports-related, however: Clubs related to improv, crafting, religions, languages, and film are among the non-academic, non-sports options. The UB Post  is the monthly student newspaper, which serves the purpose of keeping the general student population informed of upcoming campus activities, as well as relevant news. Run by students, it is available in print and online, and has been published since 1933. Leonard Robinson is the editor-in-chief. A student-run press, Plork, provides additional printing experience for students majoring in fields related to media design, publishing, and writing, as does the university's 50-year-old literary magazine, Welter. The Student Center is the central place for students—housing The Hive market and cafe, the UB Campus Pantry, the Interfaith Space, student government and organization offices, and study lounges.

The University of Baltimore has not offered any varsity sports since 1983.

Student housing
In the years 2012–2017, the number of UBalt students living near campus increased 134 percent. Students have the option to reside in The Varsity, located on West Biddle Street 0.2 miles from the campus, or in other private complexes nearby.

Campus Recreation and Wellness

UBalt has an athletic/fitness center named Campus Recreation and Wellness, which is continually growing for the betterment of the university and surrounding community. It has an aerobics studio, a sparring/boxing room, two indoor racquetball courts, a well-equipped gym, a basketball court, and locker rooms. The Recreation Center, located on the third and fourth floor of the Academic Center, offers fitness classes free of charge on a first-come, first-served basis to all members and hosts the Sport Club and Intramural Sports teams. At one time, UBalt owned and operated a golf driving range in the Mount Washington neighborhood of Baltimore. However, this facility has been leased to the city. Campus Recreation and Wellness seeks to serve the recreation, fitness, health, and leisure needs of the university community through instructional and competitive sport activities, including aerobics classes, golf lessons, intramural sports, informal recreation, and sport clubs. The Recreation Center facilities include basketball, racquetball, badminton and volleyball courts, weight and cardio rooms, aerobic and spinning studios, indoor golf cage, foosball, darts, Wii gaming system, as well as locker rooms and a sauna. The facilities are open to students, faculty, staff and Recreation Center members with valid UBalt BeeCards. 

The UBalt men's lacrosse team won four USILA Division II national championships in four consecutive years, 1956–1959.

Honor societies
The university hosts chapters of several honor societies, including:
Alpha Chi
Alpha Phi Sigma
Beta Alpha Psi
Beta Gamma Sigma
Mu Kappa Tau
Phi Alpha Theta
Phi Theta Kappa
Pi Alpha Alpha
Pi Sigma Alpha
Psi Chi
Sigma Iota Epsilon
Sigma Tau Delta
Omicron Delta Kappa

Notable alumni

Business
Peter Angelos – owner of the Baltimore Orioles 
Tom Condon – graduated from UB Law in 1981, sports agent, represents over 120 NFL players 
Bob Parsons – founder of GoDaddy
Stan White – retired NFL Player Baltimore Colts graduated from UB Law, sports agent, sportscaster, assistant football coach Gilman School

History, journalism, media, and the arts
Carole Boston-Weatherford – author and critic
Louis S. Diggs – Baltimore County historian
Ellen Lupton - Senior Curator of Contemporary Design at Cooper Hewitt, Smithsonian Design Museum
Fred Robbins – Talk show host, actor and television personality
D. Watkins - Editor at large for Salon, New York Times bestselling author and HBO writer

Mathematics, sciences and technology
Celeste Lyn Paul – User interface design expert, KDE Usability Project head, president of HacDC
Jeffrey Kluger – Senior Writer for TIME Magazine specializing in science coverage; author of books including Lost Moon: The Perilous Voyage of Apollo 13, on which the 1995 movie Apollo 13 was based.

Politics, law and government
Spiro Agnew – Vice President of the United States 1969–1973, Governor of Maryland 1967–1969 
Curt Anderson – Maryland House of Delegates District 43, 1983–1995, 2002–present 
Dale Anderson (1963) – former Baltimore County Executive and State Delegate 
 John S. Arnick (1961) – former member of the Maryland House of Delegates 
Carville Benson (1893) – U.S. Congressman for Maryland 2nd District, 1918–1921. 
Lieutenant General H Steven Blum (1968) – former Chief of the National Guard Bureau and Deputy Commander NORTHCOM. 
William P. Bolton (1909) – Congressman for Maryland 2nd District, 1949–1951. 
James W. Campbell (1969) – former member of the Maryland House of Delegates. 
Jill P. Carter (1992) – Maryland State Senator, 41st District  
J. Joseph Curran, Jr. (1959) – Maryland Attorney General, 1987–2007: Lt. Governor 1983–1987 under Harry Hughes. 
Katie O'Malley (1991) – Associate Judge for the First District Court of Maryland, wife of former Governor of Maryland and former Baltimore Mayor, Martin O'Malley. 
Terry R. Gilleland, Jr. (2001) – former member of Maryland House of Delegates 
Glen Glass (1994) – member of the Maryland House of Delegates from District 34A in Cecil County and Harford County. 
J. B. Jennings – Maryland Delegate for District 7. 
Sheryl Davis Kohl – former member of Maryland House of Delegates
Arrie Davis – former judge on the Maryland Court of Special Appeals 
Frank Kratovil – Congressman United States House of Representatives, Maryland District 1, 2009–2011
Pat McDonough – Maryland delegate. 
Richard Meehan – Mayor of Ocean City, Maryland, 2006–present. 
C. Edward Middlebrooks (1982) – former Maryland State Senator. 
Donald E. Murphy (1983) – former member of Maryland House of Delegates, 1994–2002.
Sandra Peuler – judge of the Utah Third District Court in Salt Lake City
Bishop Robinson – former Police Commissioner of Baltimore, 1984 – 1987. 
Dutch Ruppersberger – Congressman 2nd district, 2002-present, Baltimore County Executive, 1994–2002. 
William Donald Schaefer (1942) – Mayor of Baltimore 1971–1987, Governor of Maryland 1987–1995, State Comptroller 1999-2007 
John F. Slade III (1969) – former member of Maryland House of Delegates. 
Frederic N. Smalkin – Jurist-in-Residence, University of Baltimore School of Law, 2005–present

Sports
Dick Edell – lacrosse coach
Red Holzman (1920–1998) - NBA – 1948–53, 2-time NBA All-Star guard, coach, Hall of Fame.
Howard "Chip" Silverman – author, lacrosse coach
Isaiah Wilson, NBA – 1971–1972

References

External links
 
 UB Post – student newspaper

 
Universities and colleges in Baltimore
Educational institutions established in 1925
1925 establishments in Maryland
Mount Vernon, Baltimore
University of Baltimore
Baltimore, University of